Ganz may refer to:
 Ganz Works, a Hungarian manufacturer of electric railway equipment
Ganz Midwest-CBK, a Canadian toy and home décor company known for Webkinz
 Ganz, Styria, a town in the district of Mürzzuschlag in Styria, Austria
 Ganz (surname), people with the surname Ganz

See also 

 Swan-Ganz catheter, a pulmonary artery catheter
 Gantz (disambiguation)
 Gans (disambiguation)